Bos (from Latin bōs: cow, ox, bull)  is the genus of wild and domestic cattle. Bos is often divided into four subgenera: Bos, Bibos, Novibos, and Poephagus, but including these last three divisions within the genus Bos without including Bison in the genus is believed to be polyphyletic by many workers on the classification of the genus since the 1980s. The genus as traditionally defined has five extant species but this rises to eight when the domesticated varieties are counted as separate species, and 10 when the closely related genus Bison is also included.
Most but not all modern breeds of domesticated cattle are believed to have originated from the extinct aurochs. Many ancient breeds are thought to have originated from other species.
Zebus and taurine cattle are thought to descend from ancient Indian and Middle Eastern aurochs, respectively.

Description
The species are grazers, with large teeth to break up the plant material they ingest.  They are ruminants, having a four-chambered stomach that allows them to break down plant material.

Distribution
There are about 1.3 billion domestic cattle alive today, making them one of the world's most numerous mammals. Members of this genus are currently found in Africa, Asia, Europe, parts of North America, South America and also in Oceania. Their habitats vary greatly depending on the particular species; they can be found in prairies, rain forests, wetlands, savannah and temperate forests.

Ecology
Most Bos species have a lifespan of 18–25 years in the wild, with up to 36 being recorded in captivity. They have a 9–11 month gestation, depending on the species and birth one or, rarely, two young in the spring.

Most species travel in small herds ranging in size from ten to thirty members. Within most herds, there is one bull (male) for all the cows (female). Dominance is important in the herds; calves will usually inherit their mother's position in the hierarchy.

They are generally diurnal, resting in the hot part of the day and being active morning and afternoon. In areas where humans have encroached on the territory of a herd, they may turn nocturnal. Some species are also migratory, moving with food and water availability.

Taxonomy
In 2003, the International Commission on Zoological Nomenclature resolved a long-standing dispute about the naming of those species (or pairs of species) of Bos that contain both wild and domesticated forms. The commission "conserved the usage of 17 specific names based on wild species, which are pre-dated by or contemporary with those based on domestic forms", confirming Bos primigenius for the aurochs and Bos gaurus for the gaur. If domesticated cattle and gayal are considered separate species, they are to be named Bos taurus and Bos frontalis; however, if they are considered part of the same species as their wild relatives, the common species are to be named Bos primigenius and Bos gaurus.

During the 2010s, analysis of the complex genetics of the bovine lineages determined that the genus Bison needed to be relegated to a subgenus of Bos in order to retain monophyly within Bos since both extant species of Bison are phylogenetically embedded within Bos. The specific relationships in these analyses determined that the two living bison species were each other's closest living relatives, with their closest relatives amongst Bos being the yaks based on nuclear DNA. The mitochondrial DNA for the wisent was found to contradict the nuclear DNA result, and was more closely related to those of cattle, while the mitochondrial DNA of the American bison supported the nuclear DNA result of a close relationship with yaks. The discrepancy between the mitochondrial DNA of the American bison and wisent is suggested to be likely due to incomplete lineage sorting or genetic introgression into B. bonasus from other Bos species.

Species
The following species are known:
 Subgenus Bos 
 Bos taurus (domestic cattle)
 B. t. taurus (Taurine cattle)
 B. t. africanus (Sanga cattle)
 Bos (taurus) indicus (zebu or indicine cattle)
 †Bos primigenius (aurochs)
 †B. p. primigenius (Eurasian aurochs)
 †B. p. mauritanicus (North African aurochs)
 †B. p. namadicus (Indian aurochs)
 †Bos acutifrons
 †Bos buiaensis
 Subgenus Bibos 
 Bos gaurus (gaur or Indian bison)
 Bos frontalis (gayal)
 Bos javanicus (banteng) 
 B. j. domesticus (Bali cattle) 
 †Bos palaesondaicus
 †Bos sauveli (kouprey) (likely extinct)

 Subgenus Poephagus 
 Bos mutus  (wild yak)
 Bos grunniens (domestic yak)
 †Bos baikalensis
 Subgenus Bison  (traditionally treated as a separate genus)
 Bos bison (American bison)
 B. b. bison (plains bison)
 B. b. athabascae (wood bison)
 Bos bonasus (wisent or European bison)
 B. b. bonasus (lowland wisent)
 †B. b. hungarorum (Carpathian wisent)
 †B. b. caucasicus (dombay or Caucasian wisent)
 †Bos priscus (Steppe wisent)
 †Bos antiquus
 †Bos hanaizumiensis
 †Bos latifrons
 †Bos menneri
 †Bos occidentalis
 †Bos schoetensacki

 †Bos palaeosinensis
 †Bos sivalensis
 †Bos georgicus

See also

 Bovine genome
 Bull (mythology)

References

External links

 Vasey, George 1862. A monograph of the genus Bos. Scan of a historic work

 Bos
Bovines
Domesticated animals
Mammal genera
Taxa named by Carl Linnaeus